Paul Thomas Anderson is an American film director, screenwriter and producer. He has directed nine feature-length films, five short films, twenty three music videos, one documentary, one television episode as a guest segment director, and one theatrical play. He made his directorial debut with the mockumentary short film The Dirk Diggler Story (1988), at the age of 18, about a pornographic actor in the 1970s. Anderson followed it five years later with another short film, Cigarettes & Coffee (1993). Anderson wrote and directed the crime film Hard Eight (1996), starring Philip Baker Hall, John C. Reilly, Gwyneth Paltrow and Samuel L. Jackson. The film was well received. Using the basis of The Dirk Diggler Story, Anderson wrote and directed an expansion of the film, Boogie Nights (1997). It stars Mark Wahlberg as an actor in the Golden Age of Porn from the 1970s to the 1980s. The film received acclaim from critics and was a commercial success; at the 70th Academy Awards ceremony, the film was nominated for three Academy Awards, including for Best Supporting Actor (Burt Reynolds), Best Supporting Actress (Julianne Moore) and Best Original Screenplay.

His 1999 ensemble film Magnolia followed four intertwined and peculiar stories in the San Fernando Valley. The film was another critical success for Anderson and at the 72nd Academy Awards, it was nominated for three Academy Awards, including for Best Actor in a Supporting Role (Tom Cruise), Best Original Song for "Save Me" by Aimee Mann and Best Original Screenplay. Anderson directed the romantic comedy-drama Punch-Drunk Love (2002), starring Adam Sandler as a lonely man with anger issues. After a five-year absence, he directed the epic historical film There Will Be Blood (2007), based on Upton Sinclair's novel Oil! The critically acclaimed film won numerous awards including Best Actor for star Daniel Day-Lewis at the Academy Awards. It was also nominated for seven Academy Awards. After a five-year hiatus, he directed the 2012 film The Master starring Joaquin Phoenix and Philip Seymour Hoffman. The film's fictional movement "The Cause" was widely compared to the real-life religion of Scientology in the media, despite not directly referencing it.

Anderson adapted Thomas Pynchon's 2009 novel Inherent Vice into a film of the same name in 2014. Joaquin Phoenix played a stoner hippie and private investigator investigating a case involving the disappearance of his ex-girlfriend and her wealthy boyfriend. In 2015, he directed the documentary Junun about the making of album of the same name in Mehrangarh Fort, Rajasthan, India by the Israeli composer Shye Ben Tzur, English composer and Radiohead guitarist Jonny Greenwood, Indian ensemble the Rajasthan Express, and Radiohead producer Nigel Godrich. Phantom Thread (2017), starred Day-Lewis as a renowned dressmaker in the 1950s. The film was nominated for six Academy Awards. Anderson's ninth film, Licorice Pizza, was released to great acclaim in 2021, earning three Academy Award nominations. He has directed music videos for such artists as Fiona Apple, Haim, Aimee Mann, Joanna Newsom and Radiohead.

Feature films

As director and writer
Anderson also served as a producer on each film except Hard Eight.

Narrative

Documentaries

Short films

Other work

Narrative

Documentary appearances

Television

Music videos

Theatrical plays

References

External links 

 Paul Thomas Anderson at AllMovie
 Paul Thomas Anderson at Rotten Tomatoes
 

Director filmographies
American filmographies